The 25th Golden Eagle Awards were held September 21, 2010, in Changsha, Hunan province.  
Nominees and winners are listed below, winners are in bold.

Television Series

Best Television Series
Liberation/解放
Latent/潜伏
Mavin's War/马文的战争
My Youthfulness/我的青春谁做主
The Wind From North/北风那个吹
Brother's Happiness/老大的幸福
Women Country/女人的村庄
Wang Gui and Anna/王贵与安娜
Bruce Lee/李小龙传奇
Going to West Gate/走西口
My Brother Shunliu/我的兄弟叫顺溜
Summer of the Year/那年·夏天
A Beautiful Daughter-in-law Era/媳妇的美好时代

Best Directing for a Television Series
Li Sanlin for Going to West Gate

Best Writing for a Television Series
Jiang Wei for Latent

Best Actor in a Television Series
Sun Honglei for Latent
Huang Haibo for A Beautiful Daughter-in-law Era
Fan Wei for Brother's Happiness
Wang Ji for Red Cradle
Zhang Jian for Summer of the year

Best Actress in a Television Series
Yan Ni for The Wind From North
Hai Qing for A Beautiful Daughter-in-law Era
Wang Qianhua for Women Country
Yao Chen for Latent

Best Art Direction for a Television Series
Wang Cuiyun for Empire Qin

Best Cinematography for a Television Series
Cui Weidong for Once Upon Time of China

Best Lighting for a Television Series
Zheng Zili for Once Upon Time of China

Favorite Actor
Sun Honglei for Latent

Favorite Actress
Hai Qing for A Beautiful Daughter-in-law Era

Literature & Art Program

Best Literature and Art Program
2010 CCTV New Year's Gala/2010年中央电视台春节联欢晚会The 6th Golden Eagle Art Festival Opening Gala/第六届金鹰节开幕式晚会
Name of Life - Sichuan Earthquake Special Program/以生命的名义—四川省抗震救灾大型特别节目
Tiantianxiangshang/天天向上
2010 Beijing TV Globle Spring Festival Gala/2010BTV环球春晚
2010 Farmer's Sprince Festival Gala/亿万农民的笑声—2010年全国农民春节晚会
The Golden Mic Award/2008中国播音主持金话筒奖颁奖典礼
China 60-Year Anniversary Evening Gala/祖国万岁—庆祝中华人民共和国成立60周年大型文艺晚会

Best Directing for a Literature and Art ProgramZhang Xiaohai for China 60 Years National Day Special Program

Best Cinematography for a Literature and Art Program
Cinematography group for China 60 Years National Day Special Program

Best Art Direction for a Literature and Art Program
Art direction group for 2010 CCTV New Year's Gala

Children & Teens Program

Best Animation
Romance of the Three Kingdoms/三国演义Monkey King/美猴王
2010 Beijing TV Animated Spring Festival Gala/2010年北京电视台动画春晚
Pleasant Goat Sports Game/羊羊运动会
Young Yue Yun/中华小岳云
Divergence/三岔口

Documentary Program

Best Television DocumentaryChangan Street/长安街Great Three Gorges Project /大三峡
Great Parade-Flashing Back 60 Years/大阅兵—回首60年
I Love You, China/我爱你，中国
The Sichuan Road/蜀道
Great Qinling Mountains /大秦岭
Files-Secret Flying/《档案》之《绝密飞行》
Idea of Thousands Years/千古之策
Red Runway/红跑道
Great Wall/长城内外

Best Writing and Directing for a Television DocumentaryWriting & directing group of Ten Years of Macau

Best Cinematography for a Television Documentary
Cinematography group of Changan Street

References

External links
Winners List of 25th Golden Eagle Awards

2010
2010 in Chinese television
Events in Changsha
Mass media in Changsha